Maurice Léon Bazalgette (8 May 1873 – 31 December 1928) was a French literary critic, biographer and translator. His translations of the works of Walt Whitman introduced Whitman to the French public.

In 1905, through Émile Verhaeren, he became acquainted with Stefan Zweig. Zweig recounts their friendship in his memoir, The World of Yesterday.

In 1908, he published a biography of Walt Whitman, "Whitman, the man and the work". In 1909, he published a translation of Leaves of Grass. In 1924 he published a biography of Henry David Thoreau, Henry Thoreau, Sauvage.

Bazalgette frequented the Abbaye de Créteil, a community of artists founded by Georges Duhamel and Charles Vildrac. He wrote for Clarté, La Vie Ouvrière, and from 1926 to 1928 he had a column in communist newspaper L'Humanité.

He is buried in the cemetery of Avernes-sous-Exmes, Orne, where he owned a country house, the Moulin des Noës.

References

French literary critics
20th-century French translators
1873 births
1928 deaths